Vulgaris, a Latin adjective meaning common, or something that is derived from the masses of common people, may refer to:
 , the Latin translation for  the Common Era
 Era Vulgaris, pseudo-Latin for Common Era (in Latin this means Common Mistress)
 Sermo vulgaris, the vulgar Latin

Diseases
"Vulgaris", when referring to disease names, usually indicates that it is the normal, classic, or most common form of a given disease.

 Acne vulgaris, the most common form of the most common skin disease
 Ichthyosis vulgaris, the most common form of this rare skin disorder
 Impetigo vulgaris, a common skin infection, usually caused by a Streptococcus bacterium
 Lupus vulgaris, a skin disease with painful cutaneous tuberculosis lesions
 Pemphigus vulgaris, the most common form of pemphigus, a rare group of blistering autoimmune diseases that affect the skin and mucous membranes
 Psoriasis vulgaris, the plaque psoriasis, the most common form of psoriasis
 Sycosis vulgaris, the barber's itch, a once-common skin infection
 Verruca vulgaris, the common wart, a raised wart with roughened surface

Species Latin names
As it means "common", the word vulgaris is part of countless specific names for all kinds of species, for example:-

Aquilegia vulgaris, columbine
Beta vulgaris, beetroot
Calluna vulgaris, heather
Dracunculus vulgaris, dragon lily
Lissotriton vulgaris, smooth newt
Octopus vulgaris, common octopus
Primula vulgaris, common primrose
Sciurus vulgaris, red squirrel
Sturnus vulgaris, starling
Vespula vulgaris, common wasp

Varieties / subspecies 
 M. a. var. vulgaris, a variety in the species Medicago arabica
 Vulgaris group, a group in the Citrullus classification

Fictional species
 Carnivorous Vulgaris, Famishius Vulgaris Ingenuisi or Overconfidentii vulgaris, three of the fictional species Latin names for Wile E. Coyote in the Wile E. Coyote and Road Runner series

See also
 Vulgar (disambiguation)
 Vulgare, a Latin word with the same meaning
 Vulgarism, an expression or usage considered non-standard or characteristic of uneducated speech or writing
 Communis (disambiguation)